Dolichobrachium is a dubious genus of extinct poposaurid crurotarsan. Fossils have been found from the Popo Agie Formation in Wyoming and are of Late Triassic age. It was one of the first rauisuchians to have been named.

References

Poposauroids
Late Triassic reptiles of North America
Prehistoric pseudosuchian genera